Touch Kim is a former politician from Cambodia. He was Minister of Finance in 1958 and from 1967 to 1968. He was the governor of National Bank of Cambodia in the early 1970s.

References

Living people
Year of birth missing (living people)
Cambodian politicians
Governors of the National Bank of Cambodia
Government ministers of Cambodia
Finance ministers of Cambodia